Juan José López-Ibor Aliño (Madrid, 17 December 1941 - Madrid, 12 January 2015) was a Spanish psychiatrist.

Son of Juan José López-Ibor, he graduated in Medicine from the Complutense University of Madrid in 1965 and obtained his doctorate at the same university four years later. He became in 1992 Professor of Psychiatry at the Complutense University of Madrid. He directed Actas Españolas de Psiquiatría for several years.

He was Secretary General of the World Psychiatric Association from 1989 to 1995 and President of the World Psychiatric Association from 1999 to 2001.

References

Spanish psychiatrists
1941 births
2015 deaths
Complutense University of Madrid alumni
Complutense University of Madrid
World Psychiatric Association
Place of birth missing
Place of death missing